Lorena Cacciatore (born 30 September 1987) is an Italian actress.

Early life and career 
Born in Palermo, after having attended the psycho-pedagogical high school "Finocchiaro Aprile" in the Sicilian capital, she moved to Rome to become a student of the Accademia Nazionale di Arte Drammatica Silvio D'Amico, which she left after the first year due to the filming of Agrodolce.

Actress of theater, cinema and television, she made her debut at Rai in 2009 with the role of Eleonora Scaffidi in the soap opera Agrodolce. In 2011 she co-starred in La vita che corre, a television miniseries directed by Fabrizio Costa, where she plays Anna. The following year she took part in the film Love Is Not Perfect directed by Francesca Muci alongside the actress Anna Foglietta, playing the role of Adriana.

Following her academic experience she continued her training through internships abroad, working with some actor coaches of the Actors Studios in New York. After her debut at the cinema she took part in numerous Rai fictions, including Don Matteo 11, playing mostly dramatic and controversial roles.

On 26 September 2021, she became the mother of Edoardo from her relationship with football player Federico Marchetti.

Filmography

Film
L'ultimo re, directed by Aurelio Grimaldi (2010)
Love Is Not Perfect, directed by Francesca Muci (2012)
Mi rifaccio il trullo, directed by Vito Cea (2016)
Se mi vuoi bene, directed by Fausto Brizzi (2019)

Television
Fuori corso, directed by Vincenzo Coppola - TV series (2004)
Agrodolce, TV series  (2009)
La vita che corre, directed by Fabrizio Costa - TV series (2011)
Rosso San Valentino, directed by Fabrizio Costa - TV series (2012)
Provaci ancora prof!, - TV series (2012)
Un posto al sole, - TV series (2014)
Che Dio ci aiuti, directed by Francesco Vicario - TV series (2014)
Il paradiso delle signore, directed by Monica Vullo - TV series (2015)
Tutto può succedere, directed by Lucio Pellegrini - TV series (2015-2018)
Baciato dal sole, directed by Antonello Grimaldi - TV series (2016)
Sirene, directed by Davide Marengo - TV series (2017)
L'ispettore Coliandro, directed by Manetti Bros. - TV series (2017)
Don Matteo, - TV series, 3 episodes (2018)
Thou Shalt Not Kill, - TV series, 2 episodes (2018)
Mudù 9, directed by Vito Cea - sitcom (2020)
Mina Settembre, directed by Tiziana Aristarco - TV series (2021)

References

External links

1987 births
Living people
Italian film actresses
Actresses from Palermo
Italian stage actresses
Italian television actresses
People from Palermo
Mass media people from Sicily
21st-century Italian actresses